|}

The Grand Prix de Saint-Cloud is a Group 1 flat horse race in France open to thoroughbreds aged four years or older. It is run at Saint-Cloud over a distance of 2,400 metres (about 1½ miles), and it is scheduled to take place each year in late June or early July.

History
The event was established in 1904, and it was originally called the Prix du Président de la République. It was initially contested at Maisons-Laffitte over 2,500 metres by horses aged three or older. It was abandoned throughout World War I, with no running from 1915 to 1918. It resumed at Saint-Cloud in 1919.

The race was cancelled once during World War II, in 1940. Its original title was discarded in 1941, following the end of the French Third Republic. The newly named Grand Prix de Saint-Cloud was run at Longchamp (1941–42), Maisons-Laffitte (1943, 1945) and Le Tremblay (1944) before returning to Saint-Cloud in 1946.

The present system of race grading was introduced in 1971, and the Grand Prix de Saint-Cloud was classed at Group 1 level. It was cut to 2,400 metres in 1987, and closed to three-year-olds in 2005.

Records
Most successful horse (2 wins):
 Nino – 1926, 1927
 Tanerko – 1957, 1958
 Rheingold – 1972, 1973
 Helissio – 1996, 1997
 Ange Gabriel – 2002, 2003

Leading jockey (7 wins):
 Yves Saint-Martin – Relko (1964), Rheingold (1972, 1973), Dahlia (1974), Shakapour (1980, dead-heat), Akarad (1981), Strawberry Road (1985)

Leading trainer (8 wins):
 François Mathet – Tanerko (1957, 1958), Dicta Drake (1961), Match (1962), Relko (1964), Exceller (1977), Shakapour (1980, dead-heat), Akarad (1981)
 André Fabre – Village Star (1988), In the Wings (1990), Apple Tree (1994), Carnegie (1995), Fragrant Mix (1998), Plumania (2010), Meandre (2012), Waldgeist (2018)

Leading owner (5 wins):
 Marcel Boussac – Corrida (1936), Djebel (1942), Ardan (1945), Coaraze (1946), Goyama (1948)

Winners since 1970

 Spiritjim finished first in 2014, but was disqualified after failing a drug test.

Earlier winners

 1904: Gouvernant
 1905: Finasseur
 1906: Maintenon
 1907: Querido
 1908: Sea Sick
 1909: Verdun
 1910: Oversight
 1911: Ossian
 1912: De Viris
 1913: Predicateur
 1914: Sardanapale
 1915–18: no race
 1919: Radames
 1920: Eugene de Savoie
 1921: Pomme de Terre
 1922: Kircubbin
 1923: Bahadur
 1924: Pot au Feu
 1925: Cadum
 1926: Nino
 1927: Nino
 1928: Mon Talisman
 1929: Bubbles
 1930: Feb
 1931: Barneveldt
 1932: Prince Rose
 1933: Macaroni
 1934: Assuerus
 1935: Louqsor
 1936: Corrida
 1937: Vatellor
 1938: Victrix
 1939: Genievre
 1940: no race
 1941: Maurepas
 1942: Djebel
 1943: Escamillo
 1944: Un Gaillard
 1945: Ardan
 1946: Coaraze
 1947: Yong Lo
 1948: Goyama
 1949: Medium
 1950: Ocarina
 1951: Violoncelle
 1952: Fast Fox
 1953: Magnific
 1954: Banassa
 1955: Chingacgook
 1956: Burgos / Oroso *
 1957: Tanerko
 1958: Tanerko
 1959: Herbager
 1960: Sheshoon
 1961: Dicta Drake
 1962: Match
 1963: Exbury
 1964: Relko
 1965: Sea Bird
 1966: Sea Hawk
 1967: Taneb
 1968: Hopeful Venture
 1969: Felicio
</div>
* The 1956 race was a dead-heat and has joint winners.

See also
 List of French flat horse races
 Recurring sporting events established in 1904 – this race is included under its original title, Prix du Président de la République.

References

 France Galop / Racing Post:
 galop.courses-france.com:
 1904–1919, 1920–1949, 1950–1979, 1980–present

 france-galop.com – A Brief History: Grand Prix de Saint-Cloud.
 galopp-sieger.de – Grand Prix de Saint-Cloud (ex Prix du Président de la République).
 horseracingintfed.com – International Federation of Horseracing Authorities – Grand Prix de Saint-Cloud (2018).
 pedigreequery.com – Grand Prix de Saint-Cloud – Saint-Cloud.

Open middle distance horse races
Saint-Cloud Racecourse
Horse races in France
Recurring sporting events established in 1904
1904 establishments in France